Woodland Hills is an unincorporated community and census-designated place in Otoe County, Nebraska, United States. Its population was 215 as of the 2010 census.

Geography

Demographics

Education
Most of Woodland Hills is in Waverly School District 145 while a portion is in Palmyra District OR-1.

References

Unincorporated communities in Otoe County, Nebraska
Unincorporated communities in Nebraska
Census-designated places in Otoe County, Nebraska
Census-designated places in Nebraska